Stearoyl-CoA desaturase (Δ-9-desaturase) is an endoplasmic reticulum enzyme that catalyzes the rate-limiting step in the formation of monounsaturated fatty acids (MUFAs), specifically oleate and palmitoleate from stearoyl-CoA and palmitoyl-CoA. Oleate and palmitoleate are major components of membrane phospholipids, cholesterol esters and alkyl-diacylglycerol. In humans, the enzyme is encoded by the SCD gene.

Stearoyl-CoA desaturase-1 is a key enzyme in fatty acid metabolism. It is responsible for forming a double bond in Stearoyl-CoA.  This is how the monounsaturated fatty acid oleic acid is produced from the saturated fatty acid stearic-acid.

A series of redox reactions, during which two electrons flow from NADH to flavoprotein cytochrome b5, then to the electron acceptor cytochrome b5 as well as molecular oxygen introduces a single double bond within a row of methylene fatty acyl-CoA substrates. The complexed enzyme adds a single double bond between the C9 and C10 of long-chain acyl-CoAs from de-novo synthesis.

This enzyme belongs to the family of oxidoreductases, specifically those acting on paired donors, with O2 as oxidant and incorporation or reduction of oxygen. The oxygen incorporated need not be derived from O2 with oxidation of a pair of donors resulting in the reduction of O to two molecules of water.  The systematic name of this enzyme class is stearoyl-CoA,ferrocytochrome-b5:oxygen oxidoreductase (9,10-dehydrogenating). Other names in common use include Delta9-desaturase, acyl-CoA desaturase, fatty acid desaturase, and stearoyl-CoA, hydrogen-donor:oxygen oxidoreductase.  This enzyme participates in polyunsaturated fatty acid biosynthesis and ppar signaling pathway.  It employs one cofactor, iron.

Function 

Stearoyl-CoA desaturase (SCD; EC 1.14.19.1) is an iron-containing enzyme that catalyzes a rate-limiting step in the synthesis of unsaturated fatty acids. The principal product of SCD is oleic acid, which is formed by desaturation of stearic acid. The ratio of stearic acid to oleic acid has been implicated in the regulation of cell growth and differentiation through effects on cell membrane fluidity and signal transduction.

Four SCD isoforms, Scd1 through Scd4, have been identified in mouse. In contrast, only 2 SCD isoforms, SCD1 and SCD5 (MIM 608370, Uniprot Q86SK9), have been identified in human. SCD1 shares about 85% amino acid identity with all 4 mouse SCD isoforms, as well as with rat Scd1 and Scd2. In contrast, SCD5 (also known as hSCD2) shares limited homology with the rodent SCDs and appears to be unique to primates.

SCD-1 is an important metabolic control point. Inhibition of its expression may enhance the treatment of a host of metabolic diseases. One of the unanswered questions is that SCD remains a highly regulated enzyme, even though oleate is readily available, as it is an abundant monounsaturated fatty acid in dietary fat.

It catalyzes the chemical reaction

stearoyl-CoA + 2 ferrocytochrome b5 + O2 + 2 H+  oleoyl-CoA + 2 ferricytochrome b5 + 2 H2O

The 4 substrates of this enzyme are stearoyl-CoA, ferrocytochrome b5, O2, and H+, whereas its 3 products are oleoyl-CoA, ferricytochrome b5, and H2O.

Structure 
The enzyme's structure is key to its function. SCD-1 consists of four transmembrane domains. Both the amino and carboxyl terminus and eight catalytically important histidine regions, which collectively bind iron within the catalytic center of the enzyme, lie in the cytosol region. The five cysteines in SCD-1 are located within the lumen of the endoplasmic reticulum.

The substrate binding site is long, thin and hydrophobic and kinks the substrate tail at the location where the di-iron catalytic centre introduces the double bond.

The literature suggests that the enzyme accomplishes the desaturation reaction by removing the first hydrogen at C9 position and then the second hydrogen from the C-10 position. Because the C-9 and C-10 are positioned close to the iron-containing center of the enzyme, this mechanism is hypothesized to be  specific for the position at which the double bond is formed.

Role in human disease 
Monounsaturated fatty acids, the products of SCD-1 catalyzed reactions, can serve as substrates for the synthesis of various kinds of lipids, including phospholipids, triglycerides, and can also be used as mediators in signal transduction and differentiation. Because MUFAs are heavily utilized in cellular processes, variation in SCD activity in mammals is expected to influence  physiological variables, including cellular differentiation, insulin sensitivity, metabolic syndrome, atherosclerosis, cancer, and obesity. SCD-1 deficiency results in reduced adiposity, increased insulin sensitivity, and resistance to diet-induced obesity.

Under non-fasting conditions, SCD-1 mRNA is highly expressed in white adipose tissue, brown adipose tissue, and the Harderian gland. SCD-1 expression is significantly increased in liver tissue and heart in response to a high-carbohydrate diet, whereas SCD-2 expression is observed in brain tissue and induced during the neonatal myelination. Diets high in high-saturated as well as monounsaturated-fat can also increase SCD-1 expression, although not to the extent of the lipogenic effect of a high-carb diet.

Elevated expression levels of SCD1 is found to be correlated with obesity  and tumor malignancy. It is believed that tumor cells obtain most part of their requirement for fatty acids by de novo synthesis. This phenomenon depends on increased expression of fatty acid biosynthetic enzymes that produce required fatty acids in large quantities. Mice that were fed a high-carbohydrate diet had an induced expression of the liver SCD-1 gene and other lipogenic genes through an insulin-mediated SREBP-1c-dependent mechanism. Activation of SREBP-1c results in upregulated synthesis of MUFAs and liver triglycerides. SCD-1 knockout mice did not increase de novo lipogenesis but created an abundance of cholesterol esters.

SCD1 function has also been shown to be involved in germ cell determination, adipose tissue specification, liver cell differentiation and cardiac development.

The human SCD-1 gene structure and regulation is very similar to that of mouse SCD-1. Overexpression of SCD-1 in humans may be involved in the development of hypertriglyceridemia, atherosclerosis, and diabetes. One study showed that SCD-1 activity was associated with inherited hyperlipidemia. SCD-1 deficiency has also been shown to reduce ceramide synthesis by downregulating serine palmitoyltransferase. This consequently increases the rate of beta-oxidation in skeletal muscle.

In carbohydrate metabolism studies, knockout SCD-1 mice show increased insulin sensitivity. Oleate is a major constituent of membrane phospholipids and membrane fluidity is influenced by the ratio of saturated to monounsaturated fatty acids. One proposed mechanism is that an increase in cell membrane fluidity, consisting largely of lipid, activates the insulin receptor. A decrease in MUFA content of the membrane phospholipids in the SCD-1−/− mice is offset by an increase in polyunsaturated fatty acids, effectively increasing membrane fluidity due to the introduction of more double bonds in the fatty acyl chain.

See also
Cyclopropene acid
Fatty acid desaturase
Fatty acid synthesis

References

Bibliography

Further reading

External links 
 

EC 1.14.19
Iron enzymes
Enzymes of unknown structure